Aleksandr Viktorovich Gerasimov (born 12 November 1969) is a Russian retired professional footballer. He made his professional debut in the Soviet Second League B in 1990 for FC Saturn Ramenskoye.

Honours
 Russian Premier League runner-up: 1998.

References

1969 births
People from Lyubertsy
Living people
Soviet footballers
Russian footballers
FC Saturn Ramenskoye players
FC Tyumen players
Russian Premier League players
FC Chernomorets Novorossiysk players
FC Shinnik Yaroslavl players
PFC CSKA Moscow players
PFC Krylia Sovetov Samara players
FC Lokomotiv Nizhny Novgorod players
Association football midfielders
FC Znamya Truda Orekhovo-Zuyevo players
Sportspeople from Moscow Oblast